Stephnie Carmel Weir (born November 28, 1967) is an American actress, comedian, and writer. She is best known for being a main cast member and writer on the Fox sketch comedy television series Mad TV from 2000 to 2005, for which she got two Writers Guild of America Award nominations. She had starring roles on several short-lived television sitcoms, including Big Day (2006–2007), The Comedians (2015), and Happy Together (2018–2019), and starred in the 2017 comedy film Room for Rent.

Career
Weir was a consulting producer for the comedy series Raising Hope. She also appeared in Disney's Godmothered.

Counter Culture
Counter Culture is a comedy series created by Weir that was in development for the American Broadcasting Company (ABC). The pilot follows three aging sisters running their family diner together in West Texas. ABC ordered the pilot on January 30, 2012. The ensemble cast includes Kerri Kenney-Silver, Delta Burke and Emmy Award winning actresses Margo Martindale and Doris Roberts. The pilot was directed by Ted Wass.

Filmography

Film

Television

References

External links
 

21st-century American actresses
Living people
21st-century American screenwriters
American television actresses
American women television writers
American sketch comedians
1967 births
Disney people